Chinakapavaram is a village in West Godavari district in the state of Andhra Pradesh in India.

Demographics
 India census, Chinakapavaram has a population of 3111 of which 1573 are males while 1538 are females. The average sex ratio of Chinakapavaram village is 978. The child population is 322, which makes up 10.35% of the total population of the village, with sex ratio 940. In 2011, the literacy rate of Chinakapavaram village was 70.96% when compared to 67.02% of Andhra Pradesh.

See also 
 West Godavari district

References 

Villages in West Godavari district